Norapella is a genus of moths in the family Megalopygidae.

Species
Norapella bipennis Hopp, 1930
Norapella gracilis (Dognin)
Norapella parva (Schaus, 1896)
Norapella rhadina Dognin, 1914

References

Megalopygidae
Megalopygidae genera